Mollalar (also Romanized as Mollālar; also known as Mullāhlar and Mullekhlar) is a village in Zanjanrud-e Bala Rural District, in the Central District of Zanjan County, Zanjan Province, Iran. At the 2006 census, its population was 736, in 138 families.

References 

Populated places in Zanjan County